Live in Texas is a live album by American singer Lyle Lovett recorded in Austin & San Antonio, Tx August 29-September 1 1995 and released on June 29, 1999.

Track listing
All songs composed by Lyle Lovett except as indicated.

 "Penguins" – 2:35
 "I've Been to Memphis" – 4:35
 "That's Right (You're Not from Texas)" (Lovett, Ramsey, Rogers) – 5:06
 "Nobody Knows Me" – 3:07
 "If I Had a Boat" – 3:19
 "North Dakota" featuring Rickie Lee Jones (Lovett, Ramsey) – 6:28
 "She's No Lady" – 3:43
 "Here I Am" – 4:16
 "What Do You Do?" – 2:57
 "Wild Women Don't Get the Blues" (Cox) – 4:54
 "M-O-N-E-Y" (Cox) – 3:29
 "You Can't Resist It" – 5:36
 "Church" – 5:40
 "Closing Time" – 4:34

Personnel
Lyle Lovett – vocals, acoustic guitar
James Gilmer – percussion
John Hagen – cello
Ray Herndon – electric guitar
Viktor Krauss – bass
Rickie Lee Jones – harmony vocals on North Dakota
Arnold McCuller – background vocals
Francine Reed – background vocals
Sweet Pea Atkinson – background vocals
Sir Harry Bowens – background vocals
Willie Green Jr. – background vocals
Buck Reid – pedal steel guitar
Matt Rollings – piano, keyboards
Charles Rose – trombone
Harvey Thompson – saxophone
Steve Marsh – saxophone
Vinnie Ciesielski – trumpet
Dan Tomlinson – drums
Andrea Zonn – fiddle

Production notes
Produced by Lyle Lovett and Billy Williams
John Richards – engineer
Nathaniel Kunkel – engineer, mixing
John Nelson – assistant engineer, mixing assistant
Mark Wilshire – assistant engineer, mixing, mixing assistant
Tony Flores – assistant engineer, mixing, mixing assistant
Doug Sax – mastering
Ron Lewter – mastering
Robert Hadley – mastering
Michael Wilson – photography
Tim Stedman – design
Keith Tamashiro – design assistant
Gary Speakman – tour manager
Scooter DeLong – backline technician

Chart performance

Weekly charts

Year-end charts

References

Lyle Lovett albums
1999 live albums
MCA Records live albums